

Kingdom of Greece (1833–1924)

Second Hellenic Republic (1924–1935)

Kingdom of Greece (1935–1967)

Greek Military Junta (1967–1974)

Third Hellenic Republic (since 1974)

Foreign Affairs
 L